This is a list of places where there is a bat roost.

Jamaica
 Belmont Cave
 Coffee River Cave
 Green Grotto Caves
 Oxford Cave, Jamaica
 Smokey Hole Cave
 Thatchfield Great Cave
 Windsor Great Cave

United Kingdom
 Banwell Caves, Somerset, England
 Beer Quarry Caves, England
 Belle Vue Quarry, England
 Blaisdon Hall, England
 Box Mine, England
 Brockley Hall Stables, England
 Bryanston SSSI, Dorset, England
 Buckshraft Mine & Bradley Hill Railway Tunnel, England
 Caerwood and Ashberry Goose House, England
 Cheddar Gorge, Somerset, England
 Chedworth Nature Reserve, England
 Chilmark Quarries, England
 Combe Down and Bathampton Down Mines, Somerset, England
 Compton Martin Ochre Mine, Somerset, England
 Creech Grange, England
 Devil's Chapel Scowles, England
 Ebbor Gorge, Somerset, England
 Fonthill Grottoes, England
 Greywell Tunnel, England
 Hestercombe House, Somerset, England
 Iford Manor, England
 Littledean Hall, England
 Mother Ludlam's Cave, England
 Mottisfont Bats SSSI, England
 Old Bow and Old Ham Mines, England
 Old Iron Works, Mells, Somerset, England
 Paston Great Barn, England
 Perch SSSI, England
 Publow, England
 Rodney Stoke SSSI, England
 St. Dunstan's Well Catchment, Somerset, England
 Stembridge Mill, High Ham, Somerset, England
 Sylvan House Barn, England
 Tyntesfield,  Somerset, England
 Westbury Brook Ironstone Mine, England
 Wharncliffe Viaduct, England
 Wigpool Ironstone Mine, England
 Winsley Mines, England
 Woodchester Mansion, England
 Boho Caves, Northern Ireland

United States
 Ann W. Richards Congress Avenue Bridge
 Comfort, Texas
 Grandview Mine
 Hygieostatic Bat Roost
 Sugarloaf Key Bat Tower
100-F Clearwell - Hanford Site - Washington State

Reference

 *